List of ships of Serco Marine Services is a list of active ships operated by Serco Marine Services in support of Her Majesty's Naval Service (incl. Royal Navy, Royal Marines) and the Royal Fleet Auxiliary.

The ships Kingdom of Fife and Cameron are provided by Briggs Marine who won a £100M subcontract from Serco Marine Services for the support and maintenance of the Royal Navy's navigational marks (or buoys) and moorings in the United Kingdom and overseas.

List of ships

Worldwide support ship
SD Victoria Based at Portsmouth
Multi-purpose ship
SD Northern River
Moor-class diving support vessels
SD Moorfowl Based at Kyle of Lochalsh 
SD Moorhen Based at Kyle of Lochalsh 
Multicat 2510-class recovery vessels
SD Navigator Based at Portsmouth
SD Raasay Based at Kyle of Lochalsh
Multicat 2613-class utility boat
SD Angeline Based at Faslane
Recovery vessels
SD Inspector Based at Portsmouth
SD Engineer Based at Devonport
Coastal oilers
SD Teesdale Based at Portsmouth
SD Oilman Based at Faslane
SD Waterpress Based at Faslane
SD Oceanspray Based at Portsmouth
Damen ART 80-32 tug
SD Tempest Based at Portsmouth, designated tug for Queen Elizabeth Class Aircraft Carriers
Impulse-class tugs
SD Impulse Based at Faslane
SD Impetus Based at Faslane
ASD 2509-class tugs
SD Independent Based at Portsmouth
SD Indulgent Based at Portsmouth

ATD 2909-class tugs
SD Reliable Based at Faslane
SD Bountiful Based at Portsmouth
SD Resourceful Based at Faslane
SD Dependable Based at Faslane
Twin Unit Tractor Tugs
SD Adept Based at Devonport
SD Careful Based at Devonport
SD Faithful Based at Devonport
SD Forceful Based at Devonport
SD Powerful Based at Devonport
STAN 2608-class tugs
SD Hercules Based at Devonport
SD Jupiter Based at Faslane
SD Mars Based at Devonport
ASD 2009-class tugs

SD Christina Based at Portsmouth
SD Deborah Based at Devonport
SD Eileen Based at Devonport
SD Suzanne Based at Portsmouth
Felicity-class water tractors
SD Florence Based at Devonport
SD Frances Based at Devonport
SD Genevieve Based at Portsmouth
SD Helen Based at Portsmouth
Pushy Cat 1204-class tugs
SD Catherine Based at Portsmouth
SD Emily Based at Devonport
STAN 1405-class tug
SD Tilly Based at Devonport
Trials vessels
SD Warden Based at Kyle of Lochalsh 
SD Kyle of Lochalsh Based at Kyle of Lochalsh 
Storm-class tenders
SD Bovisand Based at Devonport
SD Cawsand Based at Devonport
Newhaven-class tenders
SD Newhaven Based at Devonport
SD Nutbourne Based at Portsmouth
SD Netley Based at Portsmouth
Padstow-class tender
SD Padstow Based at Devonport
Oban-class tenders
SD Oban Based at Devonport
SD Oronsay Based at Faslane
SD Omagh Based at Faslane
Personnel ferries
SD Norton Based at Portsmouth
SD Eva Based at Faslane
Fleet tenders
SD Melton Based at Kyle of Lochalsh
SD Menai Based at Falmouth
SD Meon Based at Falmouth
STAN 1505-class tenders
SD Clyde Racer Based at Faslane
SD Solent Racer Based at Portsmouth
SD Tamar Racer Based at Devonport
STAN 1905-class tenders
SD Clyde Spirit Based at Faslane
SD Solent Spirit Based at Portsmouth
SD Tamar Spirit Based at Devonport

See also

Lists of ships operated by or in support of Her Majesty's Naval Service
 List of active Royal Navy ships
 List of active Royal Fleet Auxiliary ships
 List of active Royal Marines military watercraft

References

Bibliography

External links
Serco Denholm Marine Services fleet list - unofficial list of current ships (2011)

Serco Marine Services (ships)
Ships of the United Kingdom